Countess Johanna of Hanau-Münzenberg (1610 – 13 September 1673) was a daughter of Count Albert of Hanau-Münzenberg-Schwarzenfels and Countess Ehrengard of Isenburg (1577 – 1637). Hanau-Münzenberg-Schwarzenfels was a cadet branch of Hanau-Münzenberg.

Marriage
Johanna of Hanau-Münzenberg married twice:
From September 1637 with Wild- and Rhinegrave Wolfgang Friedrich of Salm (1589 – 24 December 1638). The marriage did not produce offspring.
 on 14 December 1646 with Prince Manuel António of Portugal (1600 – 1666), a Dutch-Portuguese nobleman with family relationship to the House of Orange-Nassau. Their relation produced the following issue:
Wilhelmina Amalia (1647 – 14 November 1647)
Elisabeth Maria (20 November 1648 in Delft – 15 October 1717 in Vianen), married on 11 April 1678 with Lieutenant colonel Baron Adriaan of Gent (16 February 1645 in The Hague – 10 August 1708)

The sources point out that the countess brought in little to the marriage. Due to the Thirty Years' War, the lineage Hanau-Münzenberg-Schwarzenfels had become impoverished. Seemingly in 1633, the family had to escape from the Burg Schwarzenfels, first to Worms and later to Strasbourg where they struggled with financial problems. This explains her relatively advanced age for the first marriage.

Ancestry

References

General 
 Reinhard Dietrich: Die Landesverfassung in dem Hanauischen = Hanauer Geschichtsblätter 34. Hanau 1996. 
Detlev Schwennicke: Europäische Stammtafeln: Stammtafeln zur Geschichte der europäischen Staaten. Band 3,3. Frankfurt 1958.
 Reinhard Suchier: Genealogie des Hanauer Grafenhauses in: Festschrift des Hanauer Geschichtsvereins zu seiner fünfzigjährigen Jubelfeier am 27. August 1894, Hanau 1894.
 Ernst J. Zimmermann: Hanau Stadt und Land, 3. Auflage, Hanau 1919, ND 1978.

Notes

Bibliography 

1610 births
1673 deaths
Dutch nobility
House of Hanau